State elections were held in South Australia on 6 March 1965. All 39 seats in the South Australian House of Assembly were up for election. The incumbent Liberal and Country League led by Premier of South Australia Thomas Playford IV, in power since 1938, was defeated by the Australian Labor Party led by Leader of the Opposition Frank Walsh.

Background
Even though Labor won the 1944, 1953 and 1962 elections on the two-party vote against Thomas Playford IV and the Liberal and Country League (LCL), the electoral rural overweighting known as the Playmander since 1936 consisted of rural districts enjoying a 2-to-1 advantage in the state parliament. The seat system was also changed from multi-member to single-member. Labor's statewide two-party at the 1965 election remained unchanged at 54.3 percent, barely winning for the first and only time during the 32-year Playmander, with just a two-seat majority government. Labor won the seats of metropolitan Glenelg and rural Barossa at the 1965 election, after winning the seats of rural Chaffey and metropolitan Unley at the 1962 election. At the 1968 election, Labor still won a 53.2 percent two-party vote, however the LCL won the seats of rural Murray and rural Chaffey, forming a one-seat minority government with independent Tom Stott. If just 21 LCL votes were Labor votes in Murray in 1968, Labor would have formed majority government. The LCL won only three metropolitan seats in 1965 and 1968 – Burnside, Mitcham and marginally Torrens. The most populous metropolitan seats (13) had as much as 5-10 times the number of voters than the least populous rural seats (26), despite two thirds of the population located in the metropolitan area − at the 1968 election the rural seat of Frome had 4,500 formal votes, while the metropolitan seat of Enfield had 42,000 formal votes.

The 1965 election saw the Australian Labor Party in government for the first time since 1933. Frank Walsh, who had been Leader of the Opposition since 1960, became Premier. Despite the fact that Labor won a still-record 55 percent primary vote (on seats contested) and a landslide 54.3 percent two-party vote (state wide estimate), the Labor government only held a thin two-seat majority. The two-party vote was unchanged from the previous election where the LCL retained government, but a change of government occurred at this election due to the efficacy of Labor choosing to campaign near solely in marginal LCL seats.

Walsh’s term as Premier was marked by increased spending on public education and the implementation of far-reaching social welfare and Aboriginal Affairs legislation, although many of these changes were spearheaded by the socially liberal Don Dunstan, and the socially conservative Walsh may well have personally opposed some of these moves.
 
Walsh was never comfortable dealing with the media, particularly television, and his ascension to the job of Premier only exacerbated these problems.  A master of malapropisms, Walsh regularly had journalists, Hansard reporters, and political ally and foe alike bewildered by his statements.  To give but one example, Walsh once said in parliament "In this manner, Mr Speaker, the government has acted as if this were a diseased estate.  It's not sufficiently elasticated... The government is suffering from a complete lack of apathy in the case."  His unease with the media was seen in stark contrast to Dunstan, his Attorney-General, who would prove to be a media relations master throughout his later terms as Premier.

Walsh's awkwardness with the media was further highlighted after 1966, when Playford retired as Opposition Leader and was succeeded by 37-year-old Steele Hall. Hall was not only younger, but considerably more socially liberal than Playford.  A sagging economy and poor polling figures combined with Hall's advent to convince local Labor heavyweights that Labor could not win the next election with Walsh as Premier. Things came to a head in early 1967, when South Australian Labor power-broker Clyde Cameron publicly thanked Walsh for making the noble decision to retire to make way for a younger person.  This was news to Walsh, who had made no such decision.  After initially digging in his heels, Walsh eventually announced his retirement two weeks later, but not before attempting (without success) to manoeuvre his protégé Des Corcoran into the Premiership ahead of Dunstan.

For the first time, since 1910 to 1912, there were no by-elections necessary during the term of the parliament.

Dunstan led Labor into the 1968 election. Although Labor won 53.2 percent of the two-party vote, it lost two seats, resulting in a hung parliament with 19 seats for both parties. Lone crossbench independent MP Tom Stott held the balance of power, and announced confidence and supply support for an LCL minority government, installing Hall as premier even though the LCL had only won 46.8 percent of the two-party vote. Stott became Speaker of the South Australian House of Assembly. Dunstan spearheaded a public outcry which led Hall to finally scrap the Playmander soon after taking office.

Results

|}

 The primary vote figures were from contested seats, while the state-wide two-party-preferred vote figures were estimated from all seats.

Post-election pendulum

Results prior to 1965

Rural overweighting known as the Playmander resulted in LCL lower house minority and majority governments for decades. Upper house elections since 1941 have held 16 LCL and 4 ALP; voting rights were limited to the wealthier classes; suffrage was dependent on certain property and wage requirements. The electoral districts were drawn to favour regional areas with a 2:1 bias in place.

In the 2006 election, metro Adelaide held 35 metro districts representing 1.1 million people, with 12 rural districts representing 0.4 million people. In the 1965 election, 13 metro districts represented 0.7 million people and 26 rural districts represented 0.4 million people.

Legislative Council results

See also
Results of the South Australian state election, 1965 (House of Assembly)
Candidates of the 1965 South Australian state election
Members of the South Australian House of Assembly, 1965-1968
Members of the South Australian Legislative Council, 1965-1968
Playmander

Notes

External links
Two-party preferred figures since 1950, ABC News Online 
Legislative Council Background, ABC News Online
Australian Politics and Elections Database , University of Western Australia

Elections in South Australia
1965 elections in Australia
1960s in South Australia
March 1965 events in Australia